This article lists the oldest extant freestanding buildings in Scotland. In order to qualify for the list a structure must:
 be a recognisable building (defined as any human-made structure used or intended for supporting or sheltering any use or continuous occupancy);
incorporate features of building work from the claimed date to at least  in height and/or be a listed building.

This consciously excludes ruins of limited height, roads and statues. Bridges may be included if they otherwise fulfill the above criteria. Dates for many of the oldest structures have been arrived at by radiocarbon dating and should be considered approximate.

The main chronological list includes buildings that date from no later than 1199 AD. Although the oldest building on the list is the Neolithic farmhouse at Knap of Howar, the earliest period is dominated by chambered cairns, numerous examples of which can be found from the 4th millennium BC through to the early Bronze Age.

Estimates of the number of broch sites throughout the country, which date from the Iron Age, range from just over 100 to over 500. However, only a small percentage are sufficiently well preserved for them to be included here and some of those that could be remain undated.

As there are  relatively few structures from the latter half of the first millennium AD and a significant number from the 12th century, the latter group is  placed in a sub-list. There are larger numbers of extant qualifying structures from 1200 onwards and separate lists for 13th-century castles and religious buildings are provided. As the oldest buildings in many of the council areas in the more urbanised Central Belt date from after the 14th century, a separate list showing oldest buildings by council area is provided.

There is also a supplementary list of qualifying structures for which no confirmed date of construction is available and a short listing of substantial prehistoric structures that are not buildings as defined above.

Main list

Neolithic and Bronze Age
{| class="wikitable sortable"
|-
! Building
! Image
! Location
! Council area
! First built
! Use
! Notes
|-
| Knap of Howar
| 
| Papa Westray
| Orkney 
| 3700 BC
| House
| Oldest preserved stone house in north west Europe.
|-
| Midhowe Chambered Cairn
| 
| Rousay
| Orkney
| 3500 BC
| Tomb
| A well-preserved example of the Orkney-Cromarty type on the island of Rousay.
|-
|Unstan Chambered Cairn
|
| Stenness
| Orkney
|3450 BC
|Tomb
|Excavated in 1884, when grave goods were found, giving their name to Unstan ware.
|-
|Knowe of Yarso chambered cairn
|
| Rousay
| Orkney
|3350 BC
|Tomb
|One of several Rousay tombs. It contained numerous deer skeletons when excavated in the 1930s.
|-
|Quanterness chambered cairn
|
| St Ola
| Orkney
|3250 BC
|Tomb
|The remains of 157 individuals were found inside when excavated in the 1970s.
|-
| Skara Brae
| 
| Sandwick
|Orkney
| 3180 BC
| Settlement
| Northern Europe's best preserved Neolithic village.
|-
| Tomb of the Eagles
|
|South Ronaldsay
|Orkney
| 3150 BC
|Tomb
|In use for 800 years or more. Numerous bird bones were found here, predominantly white-tailed sea eagle.
|-
|Grey Cairns of Camster
|
| Upper Camster
|  Highland 
|3000 BC or older
|Tomb
|A group of three cairns.
|-
| Taversoe Tuick chambered cairn
|
|Rousay
|Orkney
| 3000 BC
|Tomb
|Unusually, there is an upper and lower chamber.
|-
| Holm of Papa chambered cairn
|
|Holm of Papa
|Orkney
| 3000 BC
|Tomb
|The central chamber is over 20 metres long.
|-
| Barpa Langass
| 
| North Uist
| Na h-Eileanan Siar
| 3000 BC
|Tomb
|The best preserved chambered cairn in the Hebrides.
|-
|Cuween Hill Chambered Cairn
|
| Finstown
| Orkney
|3000 BC
|Tomb
|Excavated in 1901, when it was found to contain the bones of men, dogs and oxen.
|-
|Quoyness cairn
| 
| Sanday
| Orkney
|2900 BC
|Tomb
|An arc of Bronze Age mounds surrounds this cairn.
|-
| Maeshowe
|
|Stenness
|Orkney
| 2800 BC
|Tomb
|-
|Crantit cairn
|
| Kirkwall
| Orkney
|2130 BC
|Tomb
|Discovered in 1998 near Kirkwall.
|-
| Rubha an Dùnain  passage grave
| 
| Skye
|  Highland 
|2000 BC or older 
|Tomb
|On a now uninhabited peninsula to the south of the Cuillin hills.
|-
|Corrimony chambered cairn
|
| Drumnadrochit
|  Highland 
|2000 BC or older
|Tomb
|A Clava-type passage grave surrounded by a circle of 11 standing stones.
|-
|Balnuaran of Clava
| 
| Nairn
|  Highland 
|2000 BC
|Tomb
|The largest of three is the north-east cairn, which was partially reconstructed in the 19th century. The central cairn may have been used as a funeral pyre.<ref>"A Visitors’ Guide to Balnuaran of Clava: A prehistoric cemetery. (2012) Historic Scotland.</ref>
|-
|Vinquoy chambered cairn
|
| Eday
| Orkney
|2000 BC
|Tomb
|At an elevated location on the north end of the island.
|-
|Glebe cairn
|
| Kilmartin Glen
| Argyll and Bute
|1700 BC
|Tomb
|An early Bronze Age structure with two stone cists."Kilmartin Glebe". Canmore. Retrieved 4 August 2012.
|-
|}

Iron Age

Early Historic period

12th century

13th century

Castles

Religious buildings

By council area

The following are amongst the oldest buildings in each council area of Scotland.

Other structures

Undated buildings
The following are very old buildings that meet the qualifying criteria but for which no reliable date of construction has emerged.

Other prehistoric constructions
The following are very old human constructions that do not fit the above criteria for a building.

 See also 
 Architecture of Scotland in the Prehistoric era
 Timeline of prehistoric Scotland
 Oldest buildings in the United Kingdom
 List of oldest known surviving buildings
 Newgrange, one of Ireland's oldest buildings dating from c. 3100 BC
 La Hougue Bie, one of Jersey's oldest buildings dating from c. 3500 BC

Notes

Footnotes

 References 
 Armit, Ian (1996) The archaeology of Skye and the Western Isles. Edinburgh University Press/Historic Scotland.
 Armit, I. (2003) Towers in the North: The Brochs of Scotland. Stroud. Tempus. 
 Coventry, Martin (2008) Castles of the Clans. Musselburgh. Goblinshead. 
 McDonald, R. Andrew (2007) The Kingdom of the Isles: Scotland's Western Seaboard c. 1100 – c. 1336. East Linton. Tuckwell Press. 
 Miers, Mary (2008) The Western Seaboard: An Illustrated Architectural Guide. Rutland Press. 
 Omand, Donald (ed.) (2003) The Orkney Book. Edinburgh. Birlinn. 
 Wickham-Jones, Caroline (2007) Orkney: A Historical Guide''. Edinburgh. Birlinn. 

Architectural history
Historic preservation
Scotland
Oldest